Grahame Thornton Ridgeway Hodgson (1 December 1936 – 23 January 2016) was a Welsh international rugby union player.

Hodgson was born in Ogmore Vale, and played club rugby for Ogmore Vale RFC, Aberavon RFC, Bridgend RFC, Exeter RFC, Exeter Saracens RFC, Teignmouth RFC, Torquay RFC and Neath RFC.  He played 15 tests for Wales between 1962 and 1967.  His position was full back. He died on 23 January 2016 after a short illness, aged 79.

References

External links
 Neath profile neathrugby.co.uk

1936 births
2016 deaths
Aberavon RFC players
Alumni of the University of Exeter
Barbarian F.C. players
Bridgend RFC players
Exeter Chiefs players
Glamorgan County RFC players
Llanelli RFC players
Neath RFC players
Rugby union fullbacks
Rugby union players from Bridgend County Borough
Wales international rugby union players
Welsh rugby union players
Welsh schoolteachers